Chadra, Chedra, or Cheddra is a settlement in the Bahr el Gazel (region of Chad), situated  northeast of N'Djamena. In 2009, the population of Chadra was 54,072, which included 27,656 males and 26,416 females.

Climate 
Chadra is classified by Köppen-Geiger climate classification system as hot desert (BWh). In Chadra, the average annual temperature is 	. Rainfall averages .

References

Bahr el Gazel Region
Populated places in Chad